Psalidomyrmex is a genus of ants in the subfamily Ponerinae. The genus is known from Sub-Saharan Africa, where colonies nest in rotten wood.

Species
 Psalidomyrmex feae Menozzi, 1922
 Psalidomyrmex foveolatus André, 1890
 Psalidomyrmex procerus Emery, 1901
 Psalidomyrmex reichenspergeri Santschi, 1913
 Psalidomyrmex sallyae Bolton, 1975
 Psalidomyrmex wheeleri Santschi, 1923

References

External links

Ponerinae
Ant genera
Hymenoptera of Africa